This is a list of tone rows and series. For a list of unordered collections, see set (music), Forte number, list of set classes, and trope (music).

Twelve tone rows

Other lengths

Fewer than twelve
Five

Six

Eight

Nine

Ten

Eleven

More than twelve
Thirteen

Fourteen

Seventeen

Twenty-two

Twenty-four

See also

Aggregate
Atonality
Complementation
Distance model
List of dodecaphonic and serial compositions
Serialism
Twelve-tone technique

Sources

Contemporary music lists
Tone rows and series
Tone rows